Romed Wyder (born 1967) is a Swiss filmmaker. He has been established in Geneva since 1989.

Biography 
Romed Wyder was born in 1967 in Brig-Glis, Valais, Switzerland. In 1995, he graduated with a degree from the cinema department of the Geneva University of Art and Design (HEAD) (formerly École Supérieure des Beaux-Arts, Genève). 

He is an active member of the Cinéma Spoutnik and founded Laika Films with five other filmmakers in 1993. Romed developed a tape to film system and an online widget generator. He founded Paradigma Films SA in 2003. During 12 years he was a member of the Federal Film Commission. Between 2005 and 2008 he was the president of the Swiss Filmmakers Association. He works as director, producer and screenwriter since 1990.

Filmography 
 Et Israël fut... directed and written by Romed Wyder; produced by Yasmine Abd El Aziz and Romed Wyder (2018, documentary, 52 min, DCP)
 Dawn directed by Romed Wyder; written by Billy MacKinnon; based on a novel by Elie Wiesel; produced by Samir and Romed Wyder (2014, fiction, 95 min, DCP)
 Ménagerie intérieure directed by Nadège de Benoit-Luthy, written by Nadège de Benoit Luthy and Nicole Borgeat, produced by Romed Wyder (2007, fiction, 18 min, 35mm)
 Absolut directed and produced by Romed Wyder, written by Romed Wyder, Yves Mugny and Maria Watzlawick (2004, fiction, 94 min, 35mm)
 Pas de café, pas de télé, pas de sexe directed and produced by Romed Wyder, written by Romed Wyder and Maria Watzlawick (1999, fiction, 87 min, 35mm)
 Écran d’argile directed, written and produced by Romed Wyder and Maria Watzlawick (1997, documentary, 53 min, 16mm)
 Excursion directed, written and produced by Romed Wyder (1996, fiction, 21 min, 35mm)
 Squatters directed, written and produced by Romed Wyder (1995, documentary, 70+55 min, 16mm)
 November am Meer directed, written and produced by Romed Wyder (1992, fiction, 5 min, 16mm

References

External links 
 
 Romed Wyder at Kinorium.com
 Paradigma Films SA | Romed Wyder's production company
 Laika Films | Filmmaker collective

1967 births
Film people from Geneva
Swiss film directors
Living people
People from Brig-Glis
Alumni of the École Supérieure des Beaux-Arts, Genève